The 2016 Eisenhower Trophy took place 21–24 September at the Mayakoba El Camaleón Golf Club and the Iberostar Playa Paraiso Golf Club on the Riviera Maya, south of Cancun, Mexico. It was the 30th World Amateur Team Championship for the Eisenhower Trophy and the second to be held in Mexico.

Format 
The tournament was a 72-hole stroke play team event with 72 three-man teams. The best two scores for each round counted towards the team total. Each team played two rounds on the two courses. The leading teams played at the Iberostar Playa Paraiso Golf Club on the third day and at the Mayakoba El Camaleón Golf Club on the final day.

Winners
Australia won their third Eisenhower Trophy, 19 strokes ahead of England, who took the silver medal. Austria and Ireland tied for third place and received bronze medals. Cameron Davis had the best 72-hole aggregate of 269, two better than fellow-Australian Curtis Luck.

The 2016 Espirito Santo Trophy was played on the same courses one week prior.

Teams
71 teams contested the event. Each team had three players with the exception of Armenia who were represented by only two players.

The following table lists the players on the leading teams.

Results

Source:

Individual leaders
There was no official recognition for the lowest individual scores.

Source:

References

External links
Coverage on International Golf Federation website

Eisenhower Trophy
Golf tournaments in Mexico
Eisenhower Trophy
Eisenhower Trophy
Eisenhower Trophy